"Goldie" is a song by American hip hop recording artist ASAP Rocky. It was released on April 27, 2012 as the lead single from his debut studio album Long. Live. ASAP (2013). The song was produced by Hit-Boy, who wanted to play off Rocky's laid-back style of rapping, accompanied by intentional vocal distortions, to produce a sound bordering along comatose. Beneath the beat, Hit-Boy added a reverberating chant meant to add a sinister atmosphere to the track.

Music video
The music video, which was filmed mostly in Paris, France and directed by Rocky himself, was released on his Vevo channel on May 3, 2012. It features a major appearance by ASAP Worldwide co-founder ASAP Yams.

Accolades 
Complex named the song #30 on the 50 best songs of 2012 list. Rolling Stone named the song #27 on their 50 best songs of 2012 list. BET named the song the No. 35 music video of 2012 on their year-end Notarized countdown.

Track listing
 Digital single

Charts

Certifications

Release history

References

2012 singles
2012 songs
ASAP Rocky songs
Song recordings produced by Hit-Boy
Songs written by ASAP Rocky
Songs written by Hit-Boy